The Collection is a double CD compilation album of the all-female British heavy metal band Girlschool. The album was released in 1998 by Renaissance Records, under licence from Castle Communications, and reissued in 2000 by Sanctuary Records, of which Castle had become a subsidiary. Castle was the owner of Girlschool back catalogue, acquired from Bronze and GWR.

The compilation contains five previously unreleased live tracks. All the tracks of the album were re-mastered by Robert M. Corich and Mike Brown in August 1998. The first CD contains all the singles released by Girlschool since 1983 with their b-sides, including the duet with Motörhead on the song "Please Don't Touch", originally released on the EP St. Valentine's Day Massacre. The second CD contains more singles and b-sides, some album songs, the unreleased tracks and the covers of Mud's "Tiger Feet" and of Sweet's "Fox on the Run".

Track listing

References

1998 compilation albums
Girlschool compilation albums
Sanctuary Records compilation albums
New Wave of British Heavy Metal compilation albums